Future Perfect: The Case for Progress in a Networked Age (2012) is a non-fiction book published in 2012 by American best-selling author Steven Berlin Johnson. In this book, Johnson presents a new political worldview he names “peer progressivism.” This idea promotes collaboration amongst peers and the development of peer networks for the purpose of accomplishing large undertakings and ultimately helping society grow and change for the better.

Key concepts
The main idea that Johnson promotes in Future Perfect is that productivity and innovation are best achieved through the collaborative efforts of a peer network rather than the restrictive structure of a hierarchical system. In a peer network, individuals aren’t as interested in competition or profit. Johnson presents his idea as a new political movement, with its followers referring to themselves as “peer progressives”. This new political view avoids the traditional ideas of both big government and also big markets.

Future Perfect is characterized by applicable anecdotes that aid in giving deeper explanations of his ideas. Johnson uses stories that highlight successful peer networks, such as the 3-1-1 call system, a program used in New York City that allows residents to call in issues that need to be addressed throughout the city, or also the story of a prize-based system developed by a small group of men in 18th century Britain that offered incentives to citizens who could help foster innovation in manufacturing and the arts. Johnson also uses examples of failed systems and projects, and then he analyzes the cause of the failure to determine how to learn from their mistakes. In a hierarchical organization, all of the intelligence is kept in the center of the network, leading to the decision-making being non-inclusive and stifling the flow of information. The story of the Legrand Star, the inefficiently designed French railway system that uses Paris as a central hub for all passenger trains, is Johnson’s main illustration of a failed system. These stories all promote Johnson’s idea of a decentralized peer network, one where there isn’t a clear group or location that has more power or control than another. Johnson argues that a large, diverse group of non-experts will generally make larger leaps in innovation than a small group of experts.

Critical reception
Future Perfect has been received very positively overall. The Boston Globe praises the book as being “buoyant and hopeful”. The Wall Street Journal states that Future Perfect brings optimism about the future to a nation of pessimism. It praises Johnson for pointing out the amazing accomplishments humanity has made in the past century, the past 50 years, and especially in the past 20 years. Publishers Weekly praises the book by saying of Future Perfect, “Stimulating and challenging, Johnson’s thought-provoking ideas steer us steadily into the future.”  Amongst the praise, there were a handful of reviews that criticized Johnson’s ideas as being overly optimistic and “cyber-utopian”. The Guardian addresses this criticism and explains that Johnson refutes this opinion by clarifying that he thinks of the Internet as being one example of a generally successful peer network, but he does not see it as a “cure-all”. The Boston Globe argues that Johnson is not attempting to be original in his promotion of peer progressivism, rather he is reminding society to continue practicing communal decision-making as we advance in the digital age.

See also
 Commons-based peer production
 Collaborative e-democracy
 Emergent democracy
 P2P economic system
 Network economy
 Sharing economy

References

2012 non-fiction books
Books about the media
Popular culture books
Political books
Riverhead Books books